Stanislav Petrov Stoyanov (born 10 September 1976) is a Bulgarian former football midfielder who spent most of his career at Cherno More Varna. His natural position is at defensive midfielder, but he has also played at full back, right-sided midfielder and attacking midfielder.

Career

Dobrudzha
In 1994, he signed his first professional contract with Dobrudzha Dobrich. During the 1994–95 season, Stoyanov scored his first Dobrudzha goal on his A PFG debut against Beroe Stara Zagora in a 2–0 away victory. He spent 5 seasons of his career at the club of Dobrich, playing in 97 games and scoring 7 goals.

Cherno More
In June 1999, Stoyanov joined Cherno More Varna for an undisclosed fee. He settled well and became an integral part of the Cherno More team that won promotion to A PFG in 2000, after a 6-year absence. He made his debut on 7 August 1999, in a 1–0 home victory over Lokomotiv Plovdiv. His first goal came on 18 September, in a 3–1 defeat away to Vidima-Rakovski. During his first three seasons at Ticha Stadium, he plays as a right side midfielder and a right winger.

On 2 October 2008, Stoyanov captained Cherno More in a UEFA Cup 2–2 away draw versus VfB Stuttgart.

On 16 May 2010, he made his 200th appearance for the team in the A PFG in a 2–1 home win against Montana.

On 12 January 2012, Stoyanov announced his retirement after his contract expired on 31 December 2011.

Career statistics
As of 29 November 2011

Achievements 
 Bulgarian Cup finalist with Cherno More Varna: 2 times - 2006,2008

References

Bulgarian footballers
1976 births
Living people
Association football defenders
First Professional Football League (Bulgaria) players
PFC Dobrudzha Dobrich players
PFC Cherno More Varna players
Association football midfielders